Aapla Manus (English: Our Man) is a 2018 Indian Marathi language mystery film directed by Satish Rajwade and produced by Ajay Devgn and Abhinav Shukla. A film adaptation of the Marathi play Katkon Trikon by Dr Vivek Bele, the film stars Nana Patekar, Iravati Harshe and Sumeet Raghavan in the lead roles and is Devgn's first  Marathi film as a producer. It was released on 9 February 2018. Devgn announced the film via his Twitter handle on 24 December.

Plot
Aapla Manus is a story of a young couple Bhakti & Rahul, living in an urban area. The couple lives with Rahul's father Aaba. Rahul is a lawyer & Bhakti is a college professor. Rahul's partner in the law firm Nitin is also his good friend

One day late at night, Aaba falls off their balcony & admitted to the hospital. Inspector Nagargoje, who looks very similar to Aaba & of the same age, comes to question Rahul. Rahul narrates him about the bickering relationship between his father & wife. As a consequence, their son Nishu is sent to boarding school so that he is not affected by this. 2 days before the incident, they have a short two day trip to Lonavala, which Bhakti leaves halfway & the two return the next day. 

Nagargoje accuses both of them for abetment to suicide. He provides evidence that Aaba has committed suicide, which both deny. Later they get a call from the hospital stating that Aaba has recovered from a Comatose state; however, he is still unconscious. Later Rahul tells Bhakti that he had a showdown at Lonavala with Aaba & that could have triggered his suicide. Nagargoje calls them to his home late at night & tells them it is not a suicide case. Both are enraged at him for causing such mental agony, however, since they cannot do anything, they leave peacefully. The next day Nagargoje meets Rahul at the court & puts a seed of suspicion that his wife has attempted to kill Aaba. Rahul wants to test his theory & brings him home. Nagargoje confronts Bhakti with evidence & finally, she breaks downs. Rahul tries to defend her; however, she confesses that she has attempted to kill Aaba with the help of Nitin.

Later Rahul visits Nagargoje & tries to convince him to drop charges. He tells him that the only way to save his wife is he has to confess to the crime & he would plead for lenient punishment in court. When he returns home, Bhakti tells Rahul that Nagargoje had visited her earlier in the day & told her that he suspects Rahul has tried to kill his father. To bring about the truth, she  & Nitin should play along with him, confess that she attempted to kill Aaba & then Rahul would narrate the truth in a bid to save her. 

The next day Nagargoje comes with an arrest warrant for Rahul & provides new pieces of evidence (which he had ignored earlier) to prove that he has attempted to kill Aaba. Rahul is arrested & later bailed out by Nitin. After a few days, they receive a letter from Aaba, a suicide note. Nagargoje later tells them that note or the signature did not match Aaba's handwriting. 

Later  Aaba regains consciousness & narrates the whole incident which was a plain accident & everyone is relieved. When they meet Nagargoje, they have a lengthy discussion on eroding emotional bonding between parents & children. Both of them realize their mistake & ask forgiveness from Nagargoje & Aaba. 

The film ends with estranged Nagargoje's son visiting him (apparently after a long time) as he is on his way to perform his last rites before his death (assuming his son won't be there to perform his last rites)

Cast
Nana Patekar as Maruti Nagargoje/Abba Ghokhle
Iravati Harshe as Bhakti Rahul Gokhale
Sumeet Raghavan as Rahul Ghokhale
Ajay Devgn as Vishwas special appearance at the end

Box office
Aapla Manus was successful both critically and commercially. The film was later made in Gujarati titled Dear Father.

References

External links
 

2018 films
Indian mystery thriller films
2010s mystery thriller films
Indian films based on plays
2010s Marathi-language films
Ajay Devgn
Viacom18 Studios films
Films directed by Satish Rajwade